Harris Academy Clapham is a coeducational 11-16 secondary school located in the Clapham area of Lambeth, Greater London, England. It is part of the Harris Federation. It opened to 195 pupils in September 2020 - taking in one year group, Year 7. In September 2022, the academy welcomed its third cohort of Year 7 students.

Description
The new school opened during the COVID-19 pandemic. The building had been designed to accommodate a 7 form entry, 11-16 free school. It was intended that in the first year (from September 2020) just the year 7s would be on site, and the school would fill up behind them in 2021, 2022, 2023 and 2024. It was designed by the architects Stride Treglown. The academy shares a plot with Glenbrook Primary School which had recently been rebuilt by the same architects. The available external area is limited; a key driver was a need to maximise outdoor play area. In order to do this the footprint of the building is as compact as possible, resulting in the school being 5 storeys tall. The sports hall is elevated to the second floor on columns, which provides a large covered external play area for the school to use as well as reducing the ground floor footprint. Traditional internal adjacencies were rethought, leading to ground floor elements being placed on upper floors. The external finishes were chosen to blend with those at Glenbrook Primary School, the main building is brickwork with feature detailing between window panels, and bright coloured columns supporting the sports hall.

Curricular intent
The school curriculum has been designed and published, and it has been trialled that the school will teach Spanish and Chinese to all of Key Stage 3.
General educational theory speaks of five views: the intended curriculum as published, the enacted curriculum being the one that the teachers teach, the assessed curriculum - beloved by the GCSE boards and the learned curriculum being the parts that are remembered in later life. The fifth view is the hidden curriculum, values and views being accidentally transmitted.
The Harris Academies value depth before breadth, that knowledge and vocabulary come first, enabling skills to develop. Personal development supports academic development, literacy, numeracy knowledge and skills which are vital to personal and academic success. The school consolidates the students' learning at after school co-curricula events which are provide each evening.

Virtually all maintained schools and academies follow the National Curriculum, and are inspected by Ofsted on how well they succeed in delivering a 'broad and balanced curriculum'. Schools endeavour to get all students to achieve the English Baccalaureate(EBACC) qualification - this must include core subjects a modern or ancient foreign language, and either History or Geography.

Organisation
Harris Academy Clapham will operate a three-year, Key Stage 3 (Years 7 to 9) program where all the core National Curriculum subjects are taught, and a two-year Key Stage 4 (Years 10 and 11). Students will make subject choices mid-way through Year 9 for their key stage 4 curriculum. Year 7 is mainly taught in mixed ability tutor group set. Students are taught in blocks of six 50-minute lessons each day.

Values and Ethos
The school's motto is 'Everything is possible', stating that this encompasses the idea of developing students' spiritual, moral, social and cultural wellbeing, making their school a safer environment for young people and working with neighbours, external organisations and charities.

Proposed sixth form
A sixth form college is to be built by the Harris Federation on the site of the former Territorial Army site at 73 Kings Avenue.

The site is compact, and there was opposition from residents about the mass of the building and the lack of outdoor space. According to the planning statement: “The building will accommodate some 600 sixth form students aged 16+ in Years 12 and 13, with some 70 teaching and other staff; in the first year of operation it is anticipated there will be 300 students in Year 12 and 50 staff. It will be 3, and in parts 4 storey, with a footprint of 6,027m².

References

External links
 

Secondary schools in the London Borough of Lambeth
Clapham
Educational institutions established in 2020
2020 establishments in England
Free schools in London